Conference of the Parties may refer to:
 United Nations Climate Change conference (Conference of the Parties), meeting of the UNFCCC parties
 Conference of the Parties (CITES)
 Conference of the Parties (Convention on Biological Diversity)
 Conference of the Parties (UNCCD), the supreme decision-making body of the United Nations Convention to Combat Desertification

See also
 Conference of the parties